Stade des Volcans is a multi-use stadium in Goma, Democratic Republic of the Congo. It is currently used mostly for football matches and serves as the home venue for AS Kabasha and AS Dauphins Noirs. The stadium has a capacity of 5,000 people.

Football venues in the Democratic Republic of the Congo